James Nash or Ash (died 1400), of Hereford, was an English politician.

Family
He was the illegitimate son of Richard Nash, MP.

Career
He was a Member (MP) of the Parliament of England for Hereford in January 1390, November 1390, January 1397 and 1399.

References

14th-century births
1400 deaths
English MPs January 1390
People from Hereford
English MPs November 1390
English MPs January 1397
English MPs 1399